Dodger is a British children's television series, inspired by the Artful Dodger from the Oliver Twist novel by Charles Dickens. The series serves as a prequel to the events of Oliver Twist. The first 5 episodes were made available on BBC iPlayer on 6 February 2022, after the first episode premiered on CBBC in the United Kingdom, repeats of the first series were also aired on BBC One.

Premise 
Set in 1830s Victorian London, the series revolves around Jack Dawkins, better known as the Artful Dodger, and his exploits as part of Fagin's gang, prior to his introduction in the Oliver Twist novel.

Cast

Main 

 Billy Jenkins as Jack Dawkins/Dodger
 Christopher Eccleston as Fagin
 Aabay Ali as Charley Bates
 Ellie-May Sheridan as Polly Crackitt
 Mila Lieu as Tang
 Connor Curren as Tom Chitling
 David Threlfall as Chief of Police, Sir Charles Rowan (Series 1)
 Sam C. Wilson as Bill Sikes
 Rhys Thomas as PC Duff
 Javone Prince as PC Blathers
 Lucy Montgomery as Minnie Bilge, Fagin’s landlady

Recurring 

 Lenny Rush as Morgan/The Crossing Sweeper
 Saira Choudhry as Nancy
 Tanya Reynolds as Queen Victoria
 Aron von Andrian as Prince Albert
 Alex Kingston as Lucifer

Production 
In May 2021, it was announced in a press release that CBBC had commissioned a ten-part series, following the Artful Dodger's exploits, to be produced by NBCUniversal International Studios, a division of Universal Studio Group.

Principal photography for the first series took place in Manchester and various locations around North West England. Shooting for the fifth episode took place at Grand Theatre, Blackpool.

Production on three special episodes took place over the summer of 2022 and wrapped in Bristol in September. Filming took place at Bristol's The Bottle Yard Studios and on location in the city.

Music 
The series features original music written by Joel Cadbury and Will Harper.

Release 
The first 5 episodes were made available on BBC iPlayer on 6 February 2022, after the first episode premiered on CBBC in the United Kingdom, with episodes airing weekly on the CBBC channel. Episodes 6–10 were later made available on BBC iPlayer on 13 March 2022, after the sixth episode aired on CBBC. The first series started airing weekly on the BBC's flagship channel, BBC One, from 13 March 2022.

The first two episodes in a series of three one-off specials premiered on the CBBC channel on 27 November and 4 December 2022.

NBCUniversal Global Distribution is handling international sales for the show.

Reception 
The first series was the most watched CBBC commissioned programme between September 2021 and September 2022.

Awards and nominations

References

External links 
 
 

2020s British children's television series
2022 British television series debuts
British children's drama television series
BBC children's television shows
English-language television shows
Television series set in the 1830s
Television shows set in London
Television series about orphans
CBBC shows
Television shows based on Oliver Twist
Television series by Universal Television